Yaa Naa Mahamadu IV was the King of Dagbon, the traditional kingdom of the Dagomba people in northern Ghana, from 1969 to 1974.

References

Dagomba people
Ghanaian royalty
Yaa Naa
Year of birth missing
2018 deaths